Ruelle is a surname of French origin. It may refer to:

People

David Ruelle, Belgian-French mathematical physicist
Ruelle (singer), American singer-songwriter

Places

Ruelle-sur-Touvre, commune in the Charente department in southwestern France

Mathematics

Ruelle operator
Ruelle zeta function
Ruelle-Perron-Frobenius theorem

See also
 Ruel (disambiguation)